Puget Sound Adventist Academy is a Seventh-day Adventist high school that shares a campus with Kirkland Adventist School in Kirkland, Washington, United States. It is a part of the Seventh-day Adventist education system, the world's second largest Christian school system. Its extra-curricular activities focus on outreach and community service, but also include music instruction and performance, and athletic programs.

Academics
The required curriculum includes classes in the following subject areas: Religion, English, Oral Communications, Social Studies, Mathematics, Science, Physical Education, Health, Computer Applications, Trauma Support, Addiction Support, Simplified Surgery, Fine Arts, and Electives.  International students who are interested in applying must take the Internet Based TOEFL (iBT).

Spiritual aspects
All students take religion classes each year that they are enrolled. These classes cover topics in biblical history and Christian and denominational doctrines. Instructors in other disciplines also begin each class period with prayer or a short devotional thought, many which encourage student input. Weekly, the entire student body gathers together in the auditorium for an hour-long chapel service.
Outside the classrooms there is year-round spiritually oriented programming that relies on student involvement.

See also

 List of Seventh-day Adventist secondary schools
 Seventh-day Adventist education

References

External links

Educational institutions established in 1997
High schools in King County, Washington
Schools in Kirkland, Washington
Adventist secondary schools in the United States
Private high schools in Washington (state)
1997 establishments in Washington (state)